Jérémie-Louis Décarie,  (August 30, 1870 – November 5, 1927) was a Canadian lawyer, politician, and judge in the province of Quebec.

Born in Notre-Dame-de-Grâce, Quebec, the son of Daniel-Jérémie Décarie and Philomène Leduc, Décarie was educated at Sainte-Marie College and at the Université Laval in Montreal. He was called to the Bar of Quebec in 1896 and was created a King's Counsel in 1904. He read law, first in the office of E. Barnard and later with Mercier, Gouin & Lemieux. He later became a partner in the firm of Gouin, Lemieux & Decarie. In 1903 he formed a partnership with A. Decary under the firm name of Decarie & Decary.

He was an unsuccessful Liberal candidate to the House of Commons of Canada for the riding of Jacques-Cartier in the 1900 federal election. He was elected to the Legislative Assembly of Quebec for the electoral district of Hochelaga in the 1904 election. A Liberal, he was re-elected in 1908, 1912, and 1916. In 1909, he was the Minister of Agriculture in the cabinet of Lomer Gouin. From 1909 to 1919, he was the Provincial Secretary. He did not run in 1919. He was appointed a judge in 1919.

He died in Montreal in 1927 and was buried in the Notre Dame des Neiges Cemetery.

The geographic township of Décarie in Sainte-Anne-du-Lac was named after him, and  Décarie Boulevard in Montreal is named after his family.

References

 

1870 births
1927 deaths
Candidates in the 1900 Canadian federal election
Judges in Quebec
Lawyers in Quebec
Quebec Liberal Party MNAs
People from Côte-des-Neiges–Notre-Dame-de-Grâce
Canadian King's Counsel
Canadian lawyers admitted to the practice of law by reading law
Liberal Party of Canada candidates for the Canadian House of Commons
Burials at Notre Dame des Neiges Cemetery